Repressor of RNA polymerase III transcription MAF1 homolog is a protein that in humans is encoded by the MAF1 gene.

This gene encodes a protein that is homologous to Maf1, a Saccharomyces cerevisiae protein which is highly conserved in eukaryotic cells. S. cerevisiae Maf1 is a negative effector of RNA polymerase III (Pol III). It responds to changes in the cellular environment and represses Pol III transcription. Biochemical studies identified the initiation factor TFIIIB as a target for Maf1-dependent repression.

References

Further reading